Timothy L. Pesci (June 26, 1944 – September 28, 2016) was a Democratic member of the Pennsylvania House of Representatives, where he represented the 60th legislative district from 1989 to 2000.

Pesci graduated from Freeport Area Senior High School in 1962 and earned an A.S. degree in Business Management from Butler County Community College in 1972. Pesci served in the United States Air Force from 1963 to 1966 during the Vietnam War. He served on the Freeport Borough Council in 1974 and 1975. Pesci then served as controller for Armstrong County, Pennsylvania, from 1976 to 1989. He was first elected to the Pennsylvania House of Representatives in a special election on May 16, 1989, following the death of Henry Livengood.

In the 2000 election, he was defeated for re-election by 25-year-old Republican Jeff Coleman, in spite of the district being 70% Democratic. Bill DeWeese, the House Democratic Leader, said that Pesci had run a "condescending" race against Coleman, calling his opponent "Jeffy" and describing Coleman's campaign volunteers as "the Children from the Corn," referring to the horror film.

Following his defeat, Pesci was signed as a consultant to the Democratic Caucus in a 6-month contract worth $30,000. When Pesci's request for an extension was not granted, he unleashed a "volley of four-letter oaths" against DeWeese, who terminated the contract early. In a surprising move, the House Republican Leader, John Perzel, promptly hired Pesci for a three-week contract, which gave Pesci just enough seniority to qualify for a higher state pension. Pesci died on September 28, 2016, at his home, in Freeport, Pennsylvania.

References

External links
 official PA House profile (archived)

1944 births
2016 deaths
Democratic Party members of the Pennsylvania House of Representatives
People from Freeport, Pennsylvania